Petergan Rural District is a rural district (dehestan) in the Central District of Zirkuh County, South Khorasan Province, Iran. At the 2006 census, its population was 5,865, in 1,287 families.  The rural district has nine villages.

References

Rural Districts of South Khorasan Province
Zirkuh County